This list includes sports-people who have been convicted of serious crimes (such as felonies in the United States). It comprises both professionals and those amateurs who have competed at the highest levels.

American football (gridiron)

Association football

English leagues

Scottish leagues

French leagues

Bundesliga

Breno: Arson

Dutch Football League

Brazilian Football League

Iranian leagues

International football

Track and field

Australian rules football

Baseball

Basketball

Bodybuilding

Boxing

Canadian football (gridiron)

Canoeing

Cricket

Cycling
N.B: Italics indicates retired or inactive.

Darts

Diving

Figure skating

Greco-Roman wrestling

Horse racing

Ice hockey

Martial arts

Motorsport

Rugby League

Rugby union

Sailing

Skateboarding

Snooker

Sumo wrestling

Surfing

Swimming

Tennis

Volleyball

References 

 
Convicted of felony crimes
Sportspeople convicted of crimes
Sportspeople

Lists of criminals